Joseph (Jojo) Harwood (née Lawrence; born May 3, 1990) is a British model, artist and social media personality, best known for being the first ever transgender person to win a reality based talent competition, Simon Cowell’s the You Generation Competition.

Early life 
Harwood was born and raised in Brighton. Harwood was part of an early start school scheme, studying and completing GCSE exams at the age of 10 years old. Harwood went on to study an MSc in Cosmetic Science at London College of Fashion focusing on Cosmetic Science.

Modelling 
Harwood was scouted as a model at the age of 14 when an editor from Dazed and Confused magazine discovered them on MySpace. Harwood walked in London Fashion Week for the first time at age 15 in androgynous guise.

Social Media 
Jojo developed a series of celebrity illusions, gender focused tutorials and makeup how-to videos in 2013. In 2013 Simon Cowell created the first incarnation of Got Talent on digital media, Simon Cowell’s the You Generation Competition. Harwood entered with a gender orientated piece and was chosen as the winner of the makeup category by bloggers Pixiwoo, which led to the announcement of a grand prize of $75,000 being awarded. Syco did not formally announce Harwood as the winner outside of an announcement on Twitter, and this was covered in Fast Company in 2018. Harwood was the first transgender person to win a reality based talent show, and was the first trans person to create premium beauty collaborations with multiple brands, Vice referring to Jojo as the ‘Yoda of Contemporary Drag.’ Harwood has established over 100m views on tutorial content across YouTube.

Makeup Artistry 
Jojo’s distinct makeup style attracted many celebrities and LGBT reality stars, who invited Harwood to guide them through makeup, this led to multiple covers, editorials and magazine features. Jojo was featured in Now Magazine in 2013 as the ‘Queen of Transformations.’ In 2018 Jojo co-designed the product line Jecca Blac, under L’Oreal Innovations which was a trans led, trans orientated makeup line announced on Forbes. This was met with critical acclaim, leading to Harwood being invited to contribute to the DEI guidelines with brands PUIG, and to open Estee Lauders inclusivity ERG with the VP’s of each brand. Harwood is frequently asked to consult on inclusivity in beauty, being interviewed for BBC, Vogue and Elle. Harwood was invited to be a member of the British Beauty Council in 2022, and sits on the DEI board of advisors. Harwood was invited to be an advisory board member on AI Tech Company Revieve

Activism 
Harwood is a Princes Trust ambassador, has been featured in Veganuary 2021 and has created campaigns for the UN, YouTube x Little by Little, focusing on ocean pollution as a result of the cosmetics industry, which won an award. Harwood was featured on Pride Life Global as one of the leading LGBT voices of our generation.

References 

1991 births
Living people
British models
Artists from Brighton
Transgender artists